"Tico-Tico no fubá" ("rufous-collared sparrow in the cornmeal") is a Brazilian choro song written by Zequinha de Abreu in 1917. Its original title was "Tico-Tico no farelo" ("sparrow in the bran"), but since Brazilian guitarist Américo Jacomino "Canhoto" (1889–1928) had a work with the same title, Abreu's work was given its present name in 1931, and sometime afterward Aloysio de Oliveira wrote the original Portuguese lyrics.

Outside Brazil, the song reached its peak popularity in the 1940s, with successful recordings by Ethel Smith, The Andrews Sisters (with English-language lyrics by Ervin Drake), Carmen Miranda and others.

Notable recordings
The first recording of the work was made by Orquestra Colbaz (Columbia 22029, 1931).

Ethel Smith performed it on the Hammond organ in the MGM film Bathing Beauty (1944), after which her recording reached the U.S. pop charts in November 1944, peaked at No. 14 on January 27, 1945, and sold nearly two million copies worldwide.

Carmen Miranda and Ray Conniff both made popular recordings of the song.

The song was recorded by The Andrews Sisters on March 7, 1944 and it briefly reached the charts. The song was recorded by Fred Waring and the Pennsylvanians in 1956 (Decca DL8221) on the album, "A Visit to Disneyland".

The flamenco guitarist Paco de Lucía performed this song in 1967.

In 2006, the Brazilian singer Ney Matogrosso recorded a version for his album Batuque. In 2009, Daniela Mercury recorded the song on her album Canibália.

In 2015, the Japanese band Ali Project recorded a version with new lyrics written by Arika Takarano, the singer.

Other recordings have been made by:

 Alys Robi
 Berliner Philharmoniker
 Carmen Miranda 1945
 Charlie Parker 1952
 Cherry Wainer 1965
 Cristiano Malgioglio 2017
 Dalida 1976
 Desi Arnaz 1947
 Edmundo Ros 1945
 Ethel Smith 1944
 Ferrante & Teicher 1956
 Ferrante & Teicher with Orchestra Conducted by Don Costa 1960
 Grant Green 1962
 Henry Mancini 1965
 James Booker 1980
 James Last 1965
 Jo Ann Castle 1957
 João Gilberto   
 Klaus Wunderlich 1958
 Les Baxter and His Orchestra 1959
 Les Paul and Mary Ford 1955
 Liberace 1956
 Los Machucambos 1965
 Los Iracundos 1967
 Lou Bega 1999
 Marc-André Hamelin 
 Ney Matogrosso 2001
 Oscar Alemán 1940
 Paquito D'Rivera 1989
 Percy Faith 1974  
 Perez Prado 1963
 Raúl di Blasio 1994
 Ray Conniff 1962
 Roger Williams 1958
 Stefano Bollani 2007
 The Puppini Sisters 2016
 Taco 1991
 Xavier Cugat 1945

In film and television

In Quebec the song has been used for several decades in commercials for Sico paint.

In season three of Mama's Family, episode "An Ill Wind", an intoxicated Iola briefly sings the song's chorus before passing out onto a bed.

This song can be heard on various episodes of the Belgian Kabouter Wesley cartoon.

In season one of Narcos: Mexico, episode 3 ("El Padrino"), the orchestral version of the song is played by a band during a reception.

Other uses
This song was often performed by the Grateful Dead during their tuning jams between songs. It was also played as an instrumental by James Booker with the Jerry Garcia Band.

This song was used in Tom and Jerry in the episode "Muscle Beach Tom", where Tom's rival, Butch is seen dancing with a female cat.

This song was performed in the closing ceremony of the 2016 Summer Olympics.

This song was adapted to the 2016 video games Just Dance 2017 and Civilization VI.

This song was remixed with a baile funk melody during the opening of Brazilian pop singer Anitta's set for Rock in Rio Lisboa 2018.

References to the song
A biographical movie about Zequinha de Abreu with the same title, Tico-Tico no Fubá was produced in 1952 by the Brazilian film studio Companhia Cinematográfica Vera Cruz, starring Anselmo Duarte as Abreu.

The title phrase also features in the lyrics to the song "O Pato" made famous by João Gilberto.

Lyrics

See also
 Latin music
 Salsa

References

External links

 61 versions of Tico Tico at WFMU's blog
 

1917 in Brazil
1917 songs
Brazilian songs
Choro songs
Flamenco compositions
Songs about birds
The Andrews Sisters songs
Songs with lyrics by Aloísio de Oliveira
Paco de Lucía songs
Carmen Miranda songs